Criccieth railway station serves the seaside town of Criccieth on the Llŷn Peninsula in Gwynedd, Wales.

History
The station was opened on 2 September 1867 by the Aberystwith and Welsh Coast Railway.

Goods services were withdrawn in 1964. The line between Caernarvon and Afonwen was closed the same year. Prior to this there was a through service in the summer between Criccieth and London and Birmingham. Services included London Euston via Crewe, Chester, Llandudno Junction and Caernarvon; the Pwllheli portion was detached at Afonwen and the forward coaches proceeded to Portmadoc (the spellings are those used at the time). There was also a summer Saturday service between London Paddington and Pwllheli, via Birmingham Snow Hill, Shrewsbury and Machynlleth.

The station originally had two platforms with a passing loop; this was taken out of use when the signal box closed on 16 October 1977, though the redundant track remained in place for several years. The station is now a single-platform, unstaffed halt. The platform is accessible from the High Street, and there is a car park. The main station building is in private use.

Services
The station is on the Cambrian Coast Railway with passenger services to Pwllheli, Porthmadog, Harlech, Barmouth, Tywyn, Machynlleth and Shrewsbury. Trains call every two hours each way (on request) on weekdays, with 3 trains each way on summer Sundays and a single one each way in the winter months.

References
Citations

Sources

External links

Railway stations in Gwynedd
DfT Category F2 stations
Former Cambrian Railway stations
Railway stations in Great Britain opened in 1867
Railway stations served by Transport for Wales Rail
1867 establishments in Wales
Criccieth